Reinout is a given name. Notable people with this name include:

 Reinout Oerlemans (born 1971), Dutch soap opera actor, film director, television presenter and television producer
 Reinout Scholte (born 1967), Dutch cricketer
 Reinout Scholten van Aschat (born 1989), Dutch actor
 Reinout Willem van Bemmelen (1904–1983), Dutch geologist

See also
 Reinoud (disambiguation)

Dutch masculine given names